The 1891 Northwestern Purple football team was an American football team that represented Northwestern University during the 1891 college football season. The team compiled a 2–2–3 record and was outscored by its opponents by a combined total of 72 to 42.

Schedule

References

Northwestern
Northwestern Wildcats football seasons
Northwestern Purple football